The Security Service Act 1989 (c 5) is an Act of the United Kingdom Parliament. The Act established a statutory basis of the UK Security Service (MI5) for the first time. Prior to the Act, despite its operation since 1909, successive UK governments had denied the existence of MI5. The Act begins, "There shall continue to be a Security Service .."

The first section defines the function of the Service as

In the next paragraph it adds the further function, "to safeguard the economic well-being of the United Kingdom against threats posed by the actions or intentions of persons outside the British Islands."

The Act was amended by the Security Service Act 1996 to include supporting the police and other law enforcement agencies in the prevention and detection of serious crime.

See also
David Maxwell Fyfe, 1st Earl of Kilmuir
Spycatcher

References

External links

Statutory Basis - MI5 - The Security Service

British intelligence agencies
United Kingdom Acts of Parliament 1989